Friedrich Ulmer (1877–1952) was a German film actor.

Partial filmography

 Das schwarze Amulett (1920)
 Der Totenkopf (1920)
 Die Hexe von Lolaruh (1920) as Waldläufer
 A Dying Nation (1922, part 1, 2)
 Helena (1924) as Menelaos
 Waterloo (1929) as Gneisenau
 The Tunnel (1933)
 The Csardas Princess (1934) as Prince Weylersheim
 Hubertus Castle (1934) as Count Egge
 The Old and the Young King (1935) as Von Reichmann
 The Red Rider (1935) as Generaldirektor Livius
 Joan of Arc (1935) as the capitain
 The Saint and Her Fool (1935) as Prince Georg of Brauneck
 The Monastery's Hunter (1935) as Heinrich von Inzing
 Home Guardsman Bruggler (1936) as Hans Oberwexer
 Silence in the Forest (1937) as Conrad Kersten
 The Mountain Calls (1938) as Favre
 Stärker als die Liebe (1938)
 The Right to Love (1939) as Niederegger, Gemeindevorsteher
 A Man Astray (1940) as Der Kommissar
 The Fire Devil (1940) as Reintaler, Kärntner Bauer
 Der Herr im Haus (1940) as Bongelstedt
 The Girl from Barnhelm (1940) as the president of the martial court
 Hochzeitsnacht (1941)
 Carl Peters (1941) as Prince Hohenlohe-Langenberg
 Ohm Krüger (1941) as General Joubert
 Kameraden (1941) as Major von Brockdorff
 Geheimakte WB1 (1942) as Dr. Hoffmann
 The War of the Oxen (1943) as Peter Pienzenauer
 Jugendliebe (1947) as Bürgermeister (final film role)

References

External links
 

1877 births
1952 deaths
German male film actors
German male silent film actors
Male actors from Munich
20th-century German male actors